Maudie Rachel Okittuq (born 1944) is an Inuit sculptor known for her works in whalebone and soapstone

Her work is included in the collections of the Musée national des beaux-arts du Québec and the National Gallery of Canada

Okittiuq's work was included in Kakiniit Hivonighijotaa: Inuit Embodied Practices and Meanings, at the Winnepeg Art Gallery in 2022.

References

Living people
1944 births
20th-century Canadian women artists
21st-century Canadian women artists
Inuit artists